Weddell Island is one of the Falkland Islands in the South Atlantic, lying off the southwest extremity of West Falkland.

With an area of  Weddell is the third largest island in the archipelago after East Falkland and West Falkland, and one of the largest private islands in the world. It has only one inhabited location, Weddell Settlement, with a single digit population engaged in sheep farming and tourism services. The island offers walks to wildlife watching sites and scenery destinations including some spectacular landscapes featuring the famous Falklands stone runs. Weddell is both an Important Plant Area and a priority Key Biodiversity Area.

It is a remote place, infrequently visited by a resupply ship and occasionally by private yachts, accessible by air with a short (some ) if expensive flight from the Falklands capital, Stanley.

Etymology 
Until the mid-nineteenth century Weddell Island was known as Swan Island, a name of unknown derivation recorded as early as 1785 by Capt. George Dixon, a seasoned mariner who had sailed under James Cook. Amused by this particular name and the Falklands place naming in general, he wrote: Though these islands are universally known by the name of Falkland’s, yet many of them are called by different names, just, I presume, as the fancy of different cruisers have suggested; I just mention this circumstance to prevent thy surprise, on seeing such names as Swan Island, Keppel’s Island &c &c. (One would think the name of Admiral Keppel should have been no surprise to a Royal Navy man like Dixon.) That former name is not to be confused with Swan Island in the Falkland Sound, on the other side of West Falkland.

Possibly, the island might have been named after a native bird, the Black-necked swan.  The name appeared, applied to Weddell and/or Staats and Tea Islands, and translated as ‘Island(s) of Swans’ (Île(s) des Cygnes or Islas de los Cisnes) on some French and Spanish maps, which wouldn't have happened if the cartographers knew the feature to have been named after a person or a ship.

The present name of the island comes from James Weddell, a British sealer and explorer who visited the Falklands in 1819–1824, overwintered once in 1820, and then a second time in May–September 1823 ashore on the island at Quaker Harbour. Weddell's book A Voyage Towards the South Pole documented, inter alia, certain events and persons of local history, including his running across the privateer David Jewett and the former castaway Charles Barnard. He is well known for his voyages to the Antarctic, and the Weddell seal and the geographic features Weddell Point and Weddell Glacier on South Georgia, and Weddell Sea (discovered by him in February 1823), Weddell Plain, Weddell Arm, Weddell Islands (name given by Weddell himself) and Weddell Lake in Antarctica are all named in association with him.

History

Discovery 

The island was discovered in 1766 by the British navigator and accomplished military commander John MacBride during the first hydrographic survey of the Falklands archipelago carried out by his ship HMS Jason out of Port Egmont, the early British settlement situated on Saunders Island off the northwest coast of West Falkland. Of his new discoveries Capt. MacBride wrote unfavourably: We found a mass of islands and broken lands, beaten by storms almost perpetual. His temperature records for the area were more agreeable though. As a result of that survey Weddell Island appeared on MacBride's chart of the Falklands, one of the most accurate for its time. Capt. James Cook, who surveyed and mapped South Georgia but did not visit the Falklands, based his 1777 chart of the islands on MacBride's one, inheriting some of its specific characteristics. For instance, both charts fail to show the secluded bay of Port Stephens, applying its name to present Port Albemarle instead.

Judging from contemporaneous mapping, the island was unknown to the French who established the first Falklands settlement, Port St. Louis in 1764.

The first Spanish sighting of Weddell Island was made by Miguel de Bernasani and Lieut. Francisco Orduña, from Port Stephens area, in the course of their overland trip across West Falkland in April 1769 (April 1768 according to other sources). Following a survey of the island and its principal embayment Chatham Harbour carried out by Capt. Manuel Pando in the ship San Francisco de Paula in July 1770, Weddell appeared on the map made by the ship's pilot Joseph Puig (and widely copied by other Spanish cartographers) together with Beaver and New Islands, the group denoted as Yslas de San Miguel. Puig, a Catalan, named the large bay Puerto de San Joseph after his own name saint, which name was subsequently applied to the island itself and Hispanicized to Isla San José. Such naming practices were not uncommon at the time, indeed San Miguel was Bernasani's name saint, while Port St. Louis honoured the name saint of the French navigator Louis Antoine de Bougainville.

Early history 
The early inhabitants of the island were seal hunters. While some seal skins were taken from the Falklands by Bougainville in 1764, a large scale sealing industry was only developed since the 1770s by American and British sealers who frequented Weddell and nearby islands in the process. The first to bring their sealing vessels to the Falklands were probably Capts. Gamaliel Collins, David Smith and Greenwood from New England in 1774. Due to the nature of their trade, the sealers used to spend extensive periods of time ashore, and sometimes overwintered. So did Capt. Greenwood in his vessel King George at Port Egmont in 1774, and the British sealer United States under Capt. Benjamin Hussey in 1785 in Hussey Harbour – probably the estuary States Harbour on the southeast side of States Bay (current names States Cove and Chatham Harbour respectively). On the local conditions for survival, American sealer Edmund Fanning reviewed the available sources of food and fuel to conclude in his memoirs: In fact, a person would be able to subsist at the Falkland Islands for a considerable length of time, without experiencing any great degree of suffering. As a reminder of that period, many place names in the Weddell Island area honour sealers and sealing vessels, mostly American.

The sealers favoured Weddell and nearby Beaver Island and New Island as a base for their operations in the Falklands and South Georgia on several grounds. First, the islands offered a number of excellent harbours providing shelter against sudden westerly gales. Spain was hostile, regarding sealer presence and activities as a challenge to its sovereignty claim of the Falklands. Nevertheless, the Spaniards refrained from using force against the sealers, and following the abandonment of Puerto Soledad in 1811, sealer presence spread throughout the Falklands. Finally, with the discovery of Livingston Island and other territories south of 60° south latitude in 1819, the location of the Falklands’ southwesternmost islands made them the ideal staging post for a final southbound  sailing leg to the new hunting grounds in Antarctica, with an occasional stopover at Staten Island (present Isla de los Estados) for the provision of necessary timber unavailable on the Falklands.

The Americans came to regard the Falklands seal fisheries as their traditional industry pursued freely since before the American Revolution, and did not hesitate to deploy the US Navy in protection of that industry from an Argentine attempt to curb American seal hunting by force in 1831. That ill-conceived attempt had long-lasting implications for the future of the islands, paving the way to a reassertion of British sovereignty over the Falkland Islands in 1833.

A Robinson Crusoe mise-en-scène 

In a famous Robinson Crusoe-like episode of Falklands history, American sealer Capt. Charles Barnard got marooned in the area from 11 June 1813 to 25 November 1814, together with four sailors – Jacob Green (American), and Joseph Albrook, James Louder and Samuel Ansel (Britons), accompanied by the captain's most helpful dog named Cent, and in possession of a  whaleboat. The castaways built several shelters on Weddell (Swan Island to them) while hunting feral hogs and collecting drift wood for subsistence. Under the circumstances, one of them, Ansel, developed an aggressive attitude and was temporarily exiled by his companions to survive alone at Quaker Harbour from 28 December 1813 to 16 February 1814.  In the vicinity of his tussac-built bivouac, the graves and headstones of two men were found a mile up the bay who, Barnard reasoned, must have been buried long since, as the letters were almost effaced from the stones. Following his encounter with James Weddell on New Island in 1821, the latter popularized Barnard's castaway story by his book published in 1825. Certain inaccuracies in Weddell's retelling of events and his attempt at embellishing his compatriots’ motives for taking over Barnard's ship Nanina and claiming it as a prize of the War of 1812 (subsequently, Barnard appealed successfully against the London prize court judgement and got his ship restored to him), probably prompted the American to write his Narrative of Sufferings and Adventures book published in 1829.

Barnard would later become a prominent figure in the Antarctic seal fishery, and Barnard Point and Rotch Dome on Livingston Island in the South Shetland Islands are named after him and two other American pioneers of Falklands and Antarctic sealing, the brothers Francis and William Rotch. Barnard named two features in the vicinity of Weddell Island after himself – Barnard's Island and Barnard's Harbour, present Dyke Island and Carew Harbour respectively.

Falklands War 

The island remained unoccupied by Argentine troops and virtually unaffected by military action during the 1982 Falklands War. In particular, neither land mines nor naval mines have been planted in the Weddell Island area, and indeed, anyplace west of Fox Bay, West Falkland.

On 5 June 1982, while en route from Falkland Sound to Chatham Harbour, the diesel-electric submarine HMS Onyx commanded by Lt. Cdr. Andrew Johnson – the only non nuclear powered Royal Navy sub to serve in the war – struck a pinnacle of rock off Cape Meredith at  depth, which upon subsequent dry-dock examination at Portsmouth Naval Base turned out to have damaged two torpedo tubes and dangerously impacted one of the torpedoes. On the occasion, the submarine proceeded with the transportation of a six-member Special Boat Service detachment lead by Lieut. David Boyd and Sgt. William Lewis to carry out reconnaissance of Weddell Island, take out any observation posts providing guidance for approaching enemy aircraft (none, it turned out), and insert a British team to send last minute warnings of the number and flight directions of inbound Argentine Air Force planes.

Shipwrecks and burials 
Five vessels were reportedly lost in Weddell waters: the schooner Castalia dragged ashore in 1893, the pilot schooner Hadassah wrecked in Smylie Channel in 1896, the cutter Messenger dragged ashore in 1920, and the cutter Weddell sunk at Dyke Island whilst being towed to Weddell Island in 1939.

There is a total of sixteen recorded graves on the island, including the earliest two found by Barnard in 1813. Half of them are in the Weddell Settlement Cemetery, with the first one dated 1889. Some deaths had to do with the poor emergency medical aid available to such remote places in the past.

Geography 

Weddell Island is bounded by Queen Charlotte Bay on the east and Smylie Channel on the south, and is surrounded by a number of minor islands including Dyke Island to the southeast, Sea Dog Island and Horse Block (a conspicuous sea stack) to the southwest, Tea Island, Staats Island and Governor Island to the west, Beaver Island to the northwest, and Penn Island, Barclay Island and Quaker Island to the north, with New Island lying further away on the northwest.

The island is roughly inverted triangular in shape, almost entirely bisected by Chatham Harbour. Bar its northeastern lowland part, the island is mostly hilly.

Climate 
Weddell has a maritime climate in the transition region between the tundra and subpolar zones under the Köppen-Geiger climate classification. It is influenced by the island's location north and west of the physical boundary of the Antarctic region, the Antarctic Convergence running broadly S-shaped in between the Falklands and South Georgia, and east of the southern Andes topographic barrier. The variation between the average temperature of the warmest months (January and February) and that of the coldest months (June and July) is just 9 °C (16.2 °F).

By way of comparison, Weddell has an annual temperature graph very similar to that of the Faroe Islands. While the former is located at the same geographic latitude in the Southern Hemisphere as that of London (not the Faroes) in the Northern and, accordingly, the Nordic archipelago lies over  nearer than Weddell to the relevant geographical pole, as far as temperatures are concerned that is compensated by the climatic influences of the cold water Falklands Current and the warm water Norwegian Current respectively. However, the similarity does not extend to precipitation as the Faroes get two and a half times more rainfall than Weddell does.

Weddell Island Group 
This island group in the Falklands archipelago comprises the following insular features associated with Weddell Island, i.e. lying closer to it than to neighbouring Beaver Island or New Island (which have island groups of their own), or to West Falkland:

Mapping 

Because of the Falklands' extremely indented and irregular coastline, remote location and rather late and slow process of settling the originally uninhabited islands, their mapping remained rudimentary up to the late 18th century. It was not until after the early British and Spanish hydrographic and land surveys in 1766–1770 that the islands were mapped faithfully to any detail, first their northeastern and northwestern parts where Port St. Louis (later renamed Puerto Soledad) and Port Egmont settlements were located respectively, and eventually their southeastern and southwestern areas.

 The Falkland Islands. Map of the scale 1:401280, 6⅓ English miles to 1 inch. London: Edward Stanford, 1901
 Falkland Islands Explorer Map. Scale 1:365000. Ocean Explorer Maps, 2007
 Falklands Topographic Map Series. Scale 1:50000, 29 sheets. DOS 453, 1961–1979
 Falkland Islands. Scale 1:643000 Map. DOS 906. Edition 3-OS, 1998
 Map 500k--xm20-4. Scale 1:500000 map of Weddell Island and part of West Falkland. Russian Army Maps (for the world)
 Approaches to the Falkland Islands. Scale 1:1500000 chart. Gps Nautical Charts, 2010
 Illustrated Map of Weddell Island
 Tactical pilotage chart TPC T-18B. Scale 1:500000. UK Military Survey, 1988

Old map gallery

Geology 

The oldest rocks in the Falklands are gneiss and granite in the Cape Meredith complex, around 1100 million years old. These types of rocks are visible in cliffs at the south extremity of West Falkland, Cape Meredith, and correspond to the crystalline rocks that made up the interior of the Gondwana supercontinent. They also have a great geological similarity to rocks currently found in South Africa and in Queen Maud Land in Antarctica. On top of the gneiss and granite lie layers of quartzite, sandstone, and shales or mudstone in West Falkland and adjacent areas including Weddell Island. Cross-bedding and ripple marks identify the zone where these rocks were deposited as the shallow waters of a delta environment where currents transported submarine sediments. In the case of the Falklands these paleocurrent directions mostly run northward, and are very similar to those in formations in South Africa that run southward. Comparison of the two provides evidence that the block of sandstone sediments that contains the islands has rotated. Rocks in the central part of West Falkland contain fossils of marine organisms that lived in shallow water.

Stone runs 
The modern Falklands landscape owes some of its most remarkable aspects to the polar climate of the last ice age. The islands have largely remained free of glaciers, with the exception of a few small ones on the highest hills. Nevertheless, they were repeatedly deep-frozen and battered by icy winds. The erosion of particular rock varieties caused by myriad freezing-thawing cycles taking place in periglacial conditions during the last Ice Age produced the dramatic stone runs, one of the most enigmatic features of the local landscape originally noted by Bougainville's naturalist Antoine-Joseph Pernety in 1764:

The young Darwin, who visited and explored the Falklands twice, in March 1833 and March–April 1834, wrote:

The Falkland Islands and Vitosha Mountain in Europe feature probably the most exceptional stone runs in terms of diversity, size and abundance. The highly specific combination of particular climatic conditions and rock varieties that existed there during the Quaternary explains both the formation of stone runs in certain areas of those two territories, and their absence in areas with otherwise comparable nature conditions. On the Falklands, stone runs form on outcrops of the Port Stanley and the Port Stephens Formations, and occur on East Falkland, West Falkland, and Weddell, Saunders and Keppel Islands. One particularly long stone river on Weddell Island extends , trending in a west-southwesterly direction from the plateau next west of Mount Weddell.

Flora and fauna 

Like many islands of the Falklands archipelago, Weddell is popular for its wildlife, including penguins, sealions, dolphins and a variety of other mammals and birds including endemic ones. The hogs hunted by Capt. Barnard were an early introduced alien species, recorded on Weddell Island already in the late eighteenth century. Exotic wildlife, including skunks, rheas, parrots and guanacos were introduced in the early 1930s by the then owner of the island John Hamilton (and brought in from Chile on board his ship Penelope), along with Patagonian foxes. The last, not to be confused with the extinct Falkland Island wolf, the warrah, can still be found and their eradication is being considered. One such fox eradication attempt failed in 1997–1998. Other species considered for possible eradication from Weddell include the house mice and the feral cats, most likely introduced to the Falklands by early sealing expeditions. More challenging, due to the island's size, would be an effort to eradicate the Norwegian rat; there are some successful large scale precedents though, notably those of Campbell Island and South Georgia. Several reindeer are present but not established as they are single sex. These were brought from South Georgia shortly before their eradication from that Antarctic island carried out in 2013–2015 due to environmental considerations.

A large number of alien plants including invasive ones are widespread within Weddell Island. Most conspicuous among these are a patch of Monterey cypress trees in Weddell Settlement and a number of lengthy hedges of European gorse in the vicinity of the settlement and Kelp Creek House. Both were planted on the treeless and shrubless island primarily for the purposes of wind protection. The tree plots at Weddell, Hill Cove, Roy Cove and Carcass Island are the very few sizable ones on the Falklands. Gorse has been spreading on the island with over fifteen thriving tufts located away from its original hedge lines, and needs control. Besides gorse, the introduced species currently posing the highest threats in the Falklands are Calafate (Berberis microphylla), Creeping thistle (Cirsium arvense) and Spear thistle (Cirsium vulgare). In the rivers and streams of the archipelago, introduced European brown trout (Salmo trutta) is displacing the local Zebra trout (Aplochiton zebra).

Scientific research has identified Weddell as both an Important Plant Area and a priority Key Biodiversity Area that merits protection. A survey of less than half of the island's territory carried out between 2007 and 2010 has recorded a total of 114 native species (65% of the Falkland native flora) and 41 introduced ones. The island holds a number of rare and very rare plant species, twelve endemic plant species with four of them endangered, including Moore's plantain and the largest recorded population of Falkland Rock-cress. It also hosts a globally significant population of Southern giant petrel. Germplasm collection from Weddell Island sites was carried out by the Alaska Plant Materials Center in 1998 for the purposes, among others, of possible tussac grass restoration projects in the Falklands.

Government and politics 

Within the Falkland Islands, Weddell is part of the Camp electoral constituency, which comprises the entire country outside of Stanley, and returns three of the eight elected members of the Falklands Legislative Assembly — currently Roger Edwards, Ian Hansen and Teslyn Barkman.

Ownership 
During the last one and a half centuries Weddell Island has been owned in turn by the Williams, Hamilton, Ferguson, Visick and Clifton families.  One of the past owners, Robert Ferguson, was born on the island.

With its surface area of  Weddell is one of the largest private islands in the world.

Economy 
In the course of the 19th century, sealing declined due to depletion of stocks and gave way to sheep farming as the mainstay of Falklands economy, a role shared with fishing, tourism and offshore hydrocarbon exploration. Sheep were farmed commercially for wool on the islands from the 1860s. Sheep raising on Weddell Island was established in 1871 by the Williams family who bought the island, and the island's farm at Weddell Settlement has been permanently populated since then.

The small population of the island lives in Weddell Settlement on the east coast, the remainder of the island being run as a sheep farm and wildlands. Sheep numbers have varied greatly under different island owners, between 200 and 23,000, and currently stay at 600 to 700 with an improved breeding and grazing management. Sheep raising is now confined to the Mark Point Paddocks just north of the settlement. Tourist walks from Weddell Settlement include scenery destinations like Mount Weddell and Mark Point, and wildlife watching sites like Loop Head or Hell's Kitchen Cove in Chatham Harbour. All these activities take place northeast of the line linking New Year Cove on the southeast to Kelp Creek House on the northwest. The remaining two thirds of Weddell are sparsely visited, making it the wildest of the larger Falkland Islands.

Along with a diverse and abundant local wildlife, the island's tourist attractions include also some spectacular landscapes featuring the famous Falklands stone runs that excited Charles Darwin's interest and became the subject of much debate on their origins.

Trekking the stone runs might be as hard and risky as any sport, even though the stone run boulders are fixed quite stably, providing for better safety. Otherwise, the local terrain is walker and driver friendly – mostly hilly and well drained, lacking the boggy areas encountered elsewhere in the archipelago.

The tourist and farming infrastructure at Weddell Settlement is currently being renovated; in particular, the Weddell Lodge is being extended to provide additional tourist and workers accommodation during the summer period. More tourist accommodation is available in nearby Mountain View Cottage and Sea View Cottage. Several dilapidated ‘houses’ and ‘shanties’ in remote locations outside the settlement – Kelp Creek House, Chatham House, Loop Head Shanty, Stop Cove Shanty, Quaker Shanty and Sand Point Shanty – remain from times when the entire island was stocked with sheep.

Wind turbines and solar panels, supplemented by diesel generators, supply electric energy to four houses in Weddell Settlement.

Communications 

Air distances from Weddell Airfield: Stanley Airport , RAF Mount Pleasant , Rodolfo Marsh Aerodrome , Punta Arenas Airport  and Rio Gallegos Airport .

Sea transportation is serviced by a 50-meter wooden pier in Weddell Settlement, at the head of Gull Harbour, with a ramp being presently set up. The island receives scheduled visits from the Falklands resupply vessel MV Concordia Bay every 40 days on average.  For a number of years before, this service has been provided by MV Tamar under Capt. Stephen Clifton, one of the present owners of the island.

Probably the most remarkable Weddell Island ship was the wooden two-masted cutter Feuerland (the German for Tierra del Fuego), originally sailed from Europe to Punta Arenas by the German naval aviator and WWI war hero Gunther Plüschow, and used as an expedition ship supporting his pioneering aerial survey of Patagonia and Tierra del Fuego. The ship was sold in 1929 to John Hamilton, brought to the island and renamed Penelope after his daughter, remaining based at Weddell until the 1950s and again in 1989–1993. The ship sailed for many decades and for various shipowners between the islands of the Falklands (including a brief confiscation and use by the Argentine Navy during the Falklands War), until 2006 when she was transported back to her native Germany and listed as a historic cultural monument.

Overland travel is accomplished by foot, horse, and mechanized off-road capable transport. There are two unpaved earth roads on the island, both leaving Weddell Settlement. The other one leads  in westerly direction, skirting the head of Chatham Harbour and turning north at Kelp Creek House to reach Chatham House at the west corner of the bay.

See also 
 Private island
 Stone run
 Wildlife of the Falkland Islands

References

Bibliography 
 B. Stonehouse (ed.). Encyclopedia of Antarctica and the Southern Oceans. Chichester, West Sussex: John Wiley & Sons, 2002. 404 pp. 
 Falkland Islands: British Overseas Territory, Atlantic Ocean. Encyclopædia Britannica, 2017

External links 

 Weddell Island. Copernix interactive satellite image
 Weddell Island Official Website
 Weddell Island. Falkland Islands Tourist Board
 South Atlantic Environmental Research Institute
 Weddell Island from space. NASA Johnson Space Center, 30 April 2005
 Weddell Settlement and Weddell Airfield Plan. OpenStreetMap
 Weddell Island. WMO Station 88883. WeatherCast: Weather reports worldwide

 
Private islands of South America
Islands of the Falkland Islands
History of the Falkland Islands
Falklands War
Landforms of the Falkland Islands
Seal hunting